El Festival Cultural de Arte Urbano “Estamos en la Calle”, (English: Street‐Art Cultural Festival “We’re on the Streets”) commonly known as Estamos en la Calle, is a non-profit annual festival of street art, presented in Iquitos, Peru. To date, it has been held three times (2008, 2009, and 2010). It is organized primarily by the Instituto Nacional de Cultura del Perú and a youth group of the same name. Beginning with the first festival, presentations have showcased street performers, musical works, theater, poetry, fine and graf artists, jugglers, live bands,  documentary screenings, and news conferences. The idea for “Estamos en la Calle” arose in late 2007, inspired by a much smaller event, where a few rock groups gathered to perform.

Festivals 
I Festival Cultural de Arte Urbano "Estamos en la calle" (July 7, 2008)
II Festival Cultural de Arte Urbano "Estamos en la calle" (July 20–25, 2009)
III Festival Cultural de Arte Urbano "Estamos en la calle" (August 6–28, 2010)

References

External links 
Official site

Festivals in Peru
Iquitos
Tourist attractions in Loreto Region